Richard Reynell may refer to:

Sir Richard Reynell (knight), Sheriff of Devon, 1191–94
Sir Richard Reynell, knight of Pyttney, knight
Richard Reynell (died 1585) (1519–1585), English MP
Sir Richard Reynell (died 1633) (c. 1558–1633), barrister and probably MP for Mitchell
Sir Richard Reynell, 1st Baronet (c. 1626–1699), MP for Ashburton 1690–1695 and Lord Chief Justice of Ireland
 Sir Richard Reynell, 2nd Baronet (1673–1723), Anglo-Irish politician and landowner
Richard Reynell (died 1735) (1681–1735), MP for Ashburton 1702–1708 and 1711–1734
Richard Reynell (pilot) (1912–1940), Australian fighter pilot in the Second World War

See also
 Reynell (surname), surname is an early form of the Reynolds (surname)